Lehun, also known as al-Lahun or Khirbet Lahun, is an archaeological site in Madaba Governorate, Jordan.

The site has been occupied since prehistory, through the Bronze Age, Iron Age, Nabati and Islamic periods and until the Ottoman period. The most important monuments of the site: an agricultural village dating back to the Bronze Age, mills and contemporaries, a castle, a Roman temple and fortifications in addition to a Nabati temple and a village, and evidence of stability in the Byzantine and Islamic periods.

References

External Links
Photos of Lahun at the American Center of Research

Archaeological sites in Jordan
Bronze Age sites in Asia
Iron Age sites in Asia
Nabataean sites in Jordan